Jewish Christians were the followers of a Jewish religious sect that emerged in Judea during the late Second Temple period (first century AD). These Jews believed Jesus to be the prophesied Messiah, and blended his teachings into the Jewish faith, including the observance of the Jewish law. Jewish Christianity is the foundation of Early Christianity, which later developed into Catholic and Eastern Orthodox Christianity. Christianity started with Jewish eschatological expectations, and it developed into the worship of Jesus after his earthly ministry, his crucifixion, and the post-crucifixion experiences of his followers. Modern scholarship is engaged in an ongoing debate as to the proper designation for Jesus' first followers. Many see the term Jewish Christians as anachronistic given that there is no consensus on the date of the birth of Christianity. Some modern scholars have suggested the designations "Jewish believers in Jesus" or "Jewish followers of Jesus" as better reflecting the original context.

Jewish Christians drifted apart from mainstream Judaism, eventually becoming a minority strand which had mostly disappeared by the fifth century. Jewish–Christian gospels have been lost except for fragments, so there is considerable uncertainty as to the scriptures used by this group.

The split of Christianity and Judaism took place during the first centuries CE. While the First Jewish–Roman War and the destruction of the Second Temple in 70 CE were main events, the separation was a long-term process, in which the boundaries were not clear-cut.

Etymology
No one comes to the Father except through me." The earliest recorded use of the term "Christianity" was by Ignatius of Antioch, in around 100 AD.

The term "Jewish Christian" appears in modern historical texts contrasting Christians of Jewish origin with gentile Christians, both in discussion of the New Testament church and the second and following centuries.

Origins

Jewish-Hellenistic background

Hellenism

Christianity arose as a Pharisaic movement  within the syncretistic Hellenistic world of the first century CE, which was dominated by Roman law and Greek culture. Hellenistic culture had a profound impact on the customs and practices of Jews, both in the Land of Israel and in the Diaspora. The inroads into Judaism gave rise to Hellenistic Judaism in the Jewish diaspora which sought to establish a Hebraic-Jewish religious tradition within the culture and language of Hellenism.

Hellenistic Judaism spread to Ptolemaic Egypt from the 3rd century BCE, and became a notable religio licita after the Roman conquest of Greece, Anatolia, Syria, Judea, and Egypt, until its decline in the 3rd century parallel to the rise of Gnosticism and Early Christianity.

According to Burton Mack and a minority of commentators, the Christian vision of Jesus' death for the redemption of mankind was only possible in a Hellenised milieu.

Jewish sects
During the early first century CE, there were many competing Jewish sects in the Holy Land and those that became Rabbinic Judaism and Proto-orthodox Christianity were but two of these. There were Pharisees, Sadducees, and Zealots, but also other less influential sects, including the Essenes. The first century BCE and first century CE saw a growing number of charismatic religious leaders contributing to what would become the Mishnah of Rabbinic Judaism; the ministry of Jesus would lead to the emergence of the first Jewish Christian community.

The gospels contain strong condemnations of the Pharisees, though there is a clear influence of Hillel's interpretation of the Torah in the Gospel sayings. Belief in the resurrection of the dead in the messianic age was a core Pharisaic doctrine.

Jewish and Christian messianism

Most of Jesus's teachings were intelligible and acceptable in terms of Second Temple Judaism; what set Christians apart from Jews was their faith in Christ as the resurrected messiah. While Christianity acknowledges only one ultimate Messiah, Judaism can be said to hold to a concept of multiple messiahs. The two most relevant are the Messiah ben Joseph and the traditional Messiah ben David. Some scholars have argued that the idea of two messiahs, one suffering and the second fulfilling the traditional messianic role, was normative to ancient Judaism, predating Jesus. Jesus would have been viewed by many as one or both.

Jewish messianism has its root in the apocalyptic literature of the 2nd century BCE to the 1st century CE, promising a future "anointed" leader or Messiah to resurrect the Israelite "Kingdom of God", in place of the foreign rulers of the time. According to Shaye J.D. Cohen, Jesus's failure to establish an independent Israel, and his death at the hands of the Romans, caused many Jews to reject him as the Messiah. Jews at that time were expecting a military leader as a Messiah, such as Bar Kokhba.

Jesus

Christian views

According to Christian denominations, the bodily resurrection of Jesus after his death is the pivotal event of Jesus' life and death, as described in the gospels and the epistles. According to the gospels, written decades after the events of his life, Jesus preached for a period of one to three years in the early 1st century. His ministry of teaching, healing the sick and disabled and performing various miracles, culminated in his crucifixion at the hands of the Roman authorities in Jerusalem. After his death, he appeared to his followers, resurrected from death. After forty days he ascended to Heaven, but his followers believed he would soon return to usher in the Kingdom of God and fulfill the rest of Messianic prophecy such as the resurrection of the dead and the Last Judgment.

Scholarly views

Proponents of higher criticism claim that regardless of how one interprets the mission of Jesus, he must be understood in context as a 1st-century Middle Eastern Jew.

There is widespread disagreement among scholars on the details of the life of Jesus mentioned in the gospel narratives, and on the meaning of his teachings. Scholars often draw a distinction between the Jesus of history and the Christ of faith, and two different accounts can be found in this regard. Traditional scholarship on the subject stood on traditional theology. It emphasized Paul, and de-emphasized James and the Jewish grounding of early belief in Jesus. Modern scholarship sees Jesus and his Jewish followers as grounded in the beliefs and traditions of first century Judaism.

Critical scholarship has stripped away most narratives about Jesus as legendary, and the mainstream historical view is that while the gospels include many legendary elements, these are religious elaborations added to the accounts of a historical Jesus who was crucified under the Roman prefect Pontius Pilate in the 1st-century Roman province of Judea. His remaining disciples later believed that he was resurrected.

Five portraits of the historical Jesus are supported by mainstream scholars, namely the apocalyptic prophet, the charismatic healer, the Cynic philosopher, the Jewish Messiah, and the prophet of social change.

Early Jewish Christianity
Most historians agree that Jesus or his followers established a new Jewish sect, one that attracted both Jewish and gentile converts. The self-perception, beliefs, customs, and traditions of the Jewish followers of Jesus, Jesus's disciples and first followers, were grounded in first-century Judaism. According to New Testament scholar Bart D. Ehrman, a number of early Christianities existed in the first century CE, from which developed various Christian traditions and denominations, including proto-orthodoxy, Marcionites, Gnostics and the Jewish followers of Jesus. According to theologian James D. G. Dunn, four types of early Christianity can be discerned: Jewish Christianity, Hellenistic Christianity, Apocalyptic Christianity, and early Catholicism.

The first followers of Jesus were essentially all ethnically Jewish or Jewish proselytes. Jesus was Jewish, preached to the Jewish people, and called from them his first followers. According to McGrath, Jewish Christians, as faithful religious Jews, "regarded their movement as an affirmation of every aspect of contemporary Judaism, with the addition of one extra belief – that Jesus was the Messiah."

Jewish Christians were the original members of the Jewish movement that later became Christianity. In the earliest stage the community was made up of all those Jews who believed that Jesus was the Jewish messiah. As Christianity grew and developed, Jewish Christians became only one strand of the early Christian community, characterised by combining the confession of Jesus as Christ with continued observance of the Torah and adherence to Jewish traditions such as Sabbath observance, Jewish calendar, Jewish laws and customs, circumcision, kosher diet and synagogue attendance, and by a direct genetic relationship to the earliest followers of Jesus.

Jerusalem ekklēsia

The Jerusalem Church was an early Christian community located in Jerusalem, of which James the Just, the brother of Jesus, and Peter were leaders. Paul was in contact with this community. Legitimised by Jesus' appearance, Peter was the first leader of the Jerusalem ekklēsia. He was soon eclipsed in this leadership by James the Just, "the Brother of the Lord," which may explain why the early texts contain scarce information about Peter. According to Lüdemann, in the discussions about the strictness of adherence to the Jewish Law, the more conservative view of James the Just became more widely accepted than the more liberal position of Peter, who soon lost influence. According to Dunn, this was not an "usurpation of power," but a consequence of Peter's involvement in missionary activities.

According to Eusebius' Church History 4.5.3–4: the first 15 Christian Bishops of Jerusalem were "of the circumcision". The Romans destroyed the Jewish leadership in Jerusalem in year 135 during the Bar Kokhba revolt, but it is traditionally believed the Jerusalem Christians waited out the Jewish–Roman wars in Pella in the Decapolis.

Beliefs
The Pauline epistles incorporate creeds, or confessions of faith, of a belief in an exalted Christ that predate Paul, and give essential information on the faith of the early Jerusalem Church around James, brother of Jesus. This group venerated the risen Christ, who had appeared to several persons, as in Philippians 2:6–11, the Christ hymn, which portrays Jesus as an incarnated and subsequently exalted heavenly being.

Messiah/Christ

Early Christians regarded Jesus to be the Messiah, the promised king who would restore the Jewish kingdom and independence. Jewish messianism has its root in the apocalyptic literature of the 2nd century BCE to 1st century BCE, promising a future "anointed" leader or messiah to restore the Israelite "Kingdom of God", in place of the foreign rulers of the time. This corresponded with the Maccabean Revolt directed against the Seleucid Empire. Following the fall of the Hasmonean kingdom, it was directed against the Roman administration of Judea Province, which, according to Josephus, began with the formation of the Zealots and Sicarii during the Census of Quirinius (6 CE), although full-scale open revolt did not occur until the First Jewish–Roman War in 66 CE.

Resurrection
According to the New Testament, some Christians reported that they encountered Jesus after his crucifixion. They argued that he had been resurrected (belief in the resurrection of the dead in the Messianic Age was a core Pharisaic doctrine), and would soon return to usher in the Kingdom of God and fulfill the rest of Messianic prophecy such as the resurrection of the dead and the Last Judgment.

Resurrection experiences
1 Corinthians 15:3-9 gives an early testimony, which was delivered to Paul, of the atonement of Jesus and the appearances of the risen Christ to "Cephas and the twelve", and to "James [...] and all the apostles", possibly reflecting a fusion of two early Christian groups:

According to Geza Vermes, the concept of resurrection formed "the initial stage of the belief in his exaltation", which is "the apogee of the triumphant Christ". The focal concern of the early communities is the expected return of Jesus, and the entry of the believers into the kingdom of God with a transformed body.

According to Ehrman, the resurrection experiences were a denial response to his disciples' sudden disillusionment following Jesus' death. According to Ehrman, some of his followers claimed to have seen him alive again, resulting in a multitude of stories which convinced others that Jesus had risen from death and was exalted to Heaven.

According to Paula Fredriksen, Jesus's impact on his followers was so great that they could not accept the failure implicit in his death. According to Fredricksen, before his death Jesus created amongst his believers such certainty that the Kingdom of God and the resurrection of the dead was at hand, that with few exceptions (John 20: 24–29) when they saw him shortly after his execution, they had no doubt that he had been resurrected, and the general resurrection of the dead was at hand. These specific beliefs were compatible with Second Temple Judaism.

According to Johan Leman, the resurrection must be understood as a sense of presence of Jesus even after his death, especially during the ritual meals which were continued after his death. His early followers regarded him as a righteous man and prophet, who was therefore resurrected and exalted. In time, Messianistic, Isaiahic, apocalyptic and eschatological expectations were blended in the experience and understanding of Jesus, who came to be expected to return to earth.

Bodily resurrection
A point of debate is how Christians came to believe in a bodily resurrection, which was "a comparatively recent development within Judaism." According to Dag Øistein Endsjø, "The notion of the resurrection of the flesh was, as we have seen, not unknown to certain parts of Judaism in antiquity", but Paul rejected the idea of bodily resurrection, and it also can't be found within the strands of Jewish thought in which he was formed. According to Porter, Hayes and Tombs, the Jewish tradition emphasizes a continued spiritual existence rather than a bodily resurrection.

Nevertheless, the origin of this idea is commonly traced to Jewish beliefs, a view against which Stanley E. Porter objected. According to Porter, Jewish and subsequent Christian thought were influenced by Greek thoughts, where "assumptions regarding resurrection" can be found, which were probably adopted by Paul. According to Ehrman, most of the alleged parallels between Jesus and the pagan savior-gods only exist in the modern imagination, and there are no "accounts of others who were born to virgin mothers and who died as an atonement for sin and then were raised from the dead."

Exaltation and deification
According to Ehrman, a central question in the research on Jesus and early Christianity is how a human came to be deified in a relatively short time. Jewish Christians like the Ebionites had an Adoptionist Christology and regarded Jesus as the Messiah while rejecting his divinity, while other strands of Christian thought regard Jesus to be a "fully divine figure", a "high Christology". How soon the earthly Jesus was regarded to be the incarnation of God is a matter of scholarly debate.

Philippians 2:6–11 contains the Christ hymn, which portrays Jesus as an incarnated and subsequently exalted heavenly being:

According to Dunn, the background of this hymn has been strongly debated. Some see it as influenced by a Greek worldview. while others have argued for Jewish influences. According to Dunn, the hymn contains a contrast with the sins of Adam and his disobedience. Dunn further notes that the hymn may be seen as a three-stage Christology, starting with "an earlier stage of mythic pre-history or pre-existence," but regards the humility-exaltation contrast to be the main theme.

This belief in the incarnated and exalted Christ was part of Christian tradition a few years after his death and over a decade before the writing of the Pauline epistles. According to Dunn, the background of this hymn has been strongly debated. Some see it as influenced by a Greek worldview,

According to Burton L. Mack the early Christian communities started with "Jesus movements", new religious movements centering on a human teacher called Jesus. A number of these "Jesus movements" can be discerned in early Christian writings. According to Mack, within these Jesus-movements developed within 25 years the belief that Jesus was the Messiah, and had risen from death.

According to Erhman, the gospels show a development from a "low Christology" towards a "high Christology". Yet, a "high Christology" seems to have been part of Christian traditions a few years after his death, and over a decade before the writing of the Pauline epistles, which are the oldest Christian writings. According to Martin Hengel, as summarized by Jeremy Bouma, the letters of Paul already contain a fully developed Christology, shortly after the death of Jesus, including references to his pre-existence. According to Hengel, the Gospel of John shows a development which builds on this early high Christology, fusing it with Jewish wisdom traditions, in which Wisdom was personified and descended into the world. While this "Logos Christology" is recognizable for Greek metaphysics, it is nevertheless not derived from pagan sources, and Hengel rejects the idea of influence from "Hellenistic mystery cults or a Gnostic redeemer myth".

Jewish practices and identity
The Book of Acts reports that the early followers continued daily Temple attendance and traditional Jewish home prayer. Other passages in the New Testament gospels reflect a similar observance of traditional Jewish piety such as fasting, reverence for the Torah and observance of Jewish holy days.

Paul and the inclusion of gentiles

Saul of Tarsus (Paul the Apostle)
According to Larry Hurtado, "the christology and devotional stance that Paul affirmed (and shared with others in the early Jesus-movement) was… a distinctive expression within a variegated body of Jewish messianic hopes." According to Dunn, Paul presents, in his epistles, a Hellenised Christianity. According to Ehrman, "Paul's message, in a nutshell, was a Jewish apocalyptic proclamation with a seriously Christian twist."

Paul was in contact with the early Christian community in Jerusalem, led by James the Just. Fragments of their beliefs in an exalted and deified Jesus, what Mack called the "Christ cult," can be found in the writings of Paul. According to the New Testament, Saul of Tarsus first persecuted the early Jewish Christians, but then converted. He adopted the name Paul and started proselytizing among the gentiles, adopting the title "Apostle to the Gentiles". Saint Peter, Paul and other Jewish Christians told the Jerusalem council that Gentiles were receiving the Holy Spirit, and so convinced the leaders of the Jerusalem Church to allow gentile converts exemption from most Jewish commandments at the Council of Jerusalem, which opened the way for a much larger Christian Church, extending far beyond the Jewish community.

While Paul was inspired by the early Christian apostles, his writings elaborate on their teachings, and also give interpretations which are different from other teachings as documented in the canonical gospels, early Acts and the rest of the New Testament, such as the Epistle of James.

Paul was, before his conversion, an antagonist of the followers of Jesus. Initially he persecuted the "church of God." Then he converted, starting to proselytize among the gentiles.

Inclusion of gentiles
Some early Jewish Christians believed that non-Jews must convert to Judaism and adopt Jewish customs in order to be saved. Paul criticized Peter for himself declining to eat with gentiles during a visit by some of these Christians and therefore presenting a poor example to non-Jews joining the Christians. Paul's close coworker Barnabas sided with Peter in this dispute. Those that taught that gentile converts to Christianity ought to adopt more Jewish practices to be saved, however, were called "Judaizers". Though the Apostle Peter was initially sympathetic, the Apostle Paul opposed the teaching at the Incident at Antioch and at the Council of Jerusalem. Nevertheless, Judaizing continued to be encouraged for several centuries, particularly by Jewish Christians.

Paul opposed the strict applications of Jewish customs for gentile converts, and argued with the leaders of the Jerusalem Church to allow gentile converts exemption from most Jewish commandments at the Council of Jerusalem, where Paul met with the "pillars of Jerusalem Church" (whom Paul identifies as Peter, Jesus's brother James, and John) over whether gentile Christians need to keep the Jewish Law and be circumcised. According to Acts, James played a prominent role in the formulation of the council's decision ( NRSV) that circumcision was not a requirement. In Galatians, Paul says that James, Peter and John will minister to the "circumcised" (in general Jews and Jewish proselytes) in Jerusalem, while Paul and his fellows will minister to the "uncircumcised" (in general, gentiles) (Galatians 2:9).

The Catholic Encyclopedia claims: "St. Paul's account of the incident leaves no doubt that St. Peter saw the justice of the rebuke." However, L. Michael White's From Jesus to Christianity claims: "The blowup with Peter was a total failure of political bravado, and Paul soon left Antioch as persona non grata, never again to return." Scholar James D. G. Dunn, who coined the phrase "New Perspective on Paul", has proposed that Peter was the "bridge-man" (i.e., the pontifex maximus) between the two other "prominent leading figures" of early Christianity: Paul and James, the brother of Jesus.

Hellenistic influences
Talmud scholar Daniel Boyarin has argued that Paul's theology of the spirit is more deeply rooted in Hellenistic Judaism than generally believed. In A Radical Jew, Boyarin argues that the Apostle Paul combined the life of Jesus with Greek philosophy to reinterpret the Hebrew Bible in terms of the Platonic opposition between the ideal (which is real) and the material (which is false). Judaism is a material religion, in which membership is based not on belief but rather descent from Abraham, physically marked by circumcision, and focusing on how to live this life properly. Paul saw in the symbol of a resurrected Jesus the possibility of a spiritual rather than corporeal Messiah. He used this notion of Messiah to argue for a religion through which all people—not just descendants of Abraham—could worship the God of Abraham. Unlike Judaism, which holds that it is the proper religion only of the Jews, Pauline Christianity claimed to be the proper religion for all people.

By appealing to the Platonic distinction between the material and the ideal, Paul showed how the spirit of Christ could provide all people a way to worship the God who had previously been worshipped only by Jews, Jewish proselytes and God-fearers, although Jews claimed that he was the one and only God of all. Boyarin roots Paul's work in Hellenistic Judaism and insists that Paul was thoroughly Jewish, but argues that Pauline theology made his version of Christianity appealing to gentiles. Boyarin also sees this Platonic reworking of both Jesus's teachings and Pharisaic Judaism as essential to the emergence of Christianity as a distinct religion, because it justified a Judaism without Jewish law.

Split of early Christianity and Judaism

Emergence as separate religious communities
As Christianity grew throughout the gentile world, the developing Christian tradition diverged from its Jewish and Jerusalem roots. Historians continue to debate the precise moment when early Christianity established itself as a new religion, apart and distinct from Judaism. It is difficult to trace the process by which the two separated or to know exactly when this began. Jewish Christians continued to worship in synagogues together with contemporary Jews for centuries. Some scholars have found evidence of continuous interactions between Jewish-Christian and Rabbinic movements from the mid-to late second century CE to the fourth century CE. Philip S. Alexander characterizes the question of when Christianity and Judaism parted company and went their separate ways as "one of those deceptively simple questions which should be approached with great care". The first centuries of belief in Jesus were characterized by great uncertainty and religious creativity. "Groups of believers coalesced into proto-factions of like-minded individuals, and then into factions. […] The degree of doctrinal cohesion of these groups is unknown. As attested by the extant texts, confusion and chaos were rampant." At first, early belief in Jesus was very much a local phenomenon with some degree of coordination among communities on a regional basis.

Both Early Christianity and Early Rabbinic Judaism were far less orthodox and less theologically homogeneous than in modern day. Both religions were significantly influenced by Hellenistic religion and borrowed allegories and concepts from Classical Hellenistic philosophy and the works of the Greek-speaking Jewish authors of the end of the Second Temple period. The two schools of thought eventually firmed up their respective "norms" and doctrines, notably by increasingly diverging on key issues such as the status of "purity laws", the validity of Judeo-Christian messianic beliefs, and, more importantly, the use of Koine Greek and Latin as sacerdotal languages replacing Biblical Hebrew.

Trajectory
Heinrich Graetz postulated a Council of Jamnia in 90 that excluded Christians from the synagogues, but this is disputed. Jewish Christians continued to worship in synagogues for centuries.

According to historian Shaye J. D. Cohen, "the separation of Christianity from Judaism was a process, not an event", in which the church became "more and more gentile, and less and less Jewish". According to Cohen, early Christianity ceased to be a Jewish sect when it ceased to observe Jewish practices, such as circumcision. According to Cohen, this process ended in 70 CE, after the great revolt, when various Jewish sects disappeared and Pharisaic Judaism evolved into Rabbinic Judaism, and Christianity emerged as a distinct religion.

Talmudist and professor of Jewish studies Daniel Boyarin proposes a revised understanding of the interactions between nascent Christianity and Judaism in late antiquity, viewing the two "new" religions as intensely and complexly intertwined throughout this period. According to Boyarin, Judaism and Christianity "were part of one complex religious family, twins in a womb", for at least three centuries. Alan Segal also states that "one can speak of a 'twin birth' of two new Judaisms, both markedly different from the religious systems that preceded them".

According to Robert Goldenberg, it is increasingly accepted among scholars that "at the end of the 1st century CE there were not yet two separate religions called 'Judaism' and 'Christianity.

Jewish Christianity fell into decline during the Jewish–Roman wars (66–135) and the growing anti-Judaism perhaps best personified by Marcion of Sinope (c. 150). With persecution by the Nicene Christians from the time of the Roman Emperor Constantine in the 4th century, Jewish Christians sought refuge outside the boundaries of the Empire, in Arabia and further afield. Within the Empire and later elsewhere it was dominated by the gentile-based Christianity which became the State church of the Roman Empire and which took control of sites in the Holy Land such as the Church of the Holy Sepulchre and the Cenacle and appointed subsequent Bishops of Jerusalem.

First Jewish–Roman War and the destruction of the Temple

Full-scale, open revolt against the Romans occurred with the First Jewish–Roman War in 66 CE. In 70 CE, Jerusalem was besieged and the Second Temple was destroyed. This event was a profoundly traumatic experience for the Jews, who were now confronted with difficult and far-reaching questions. After the destruction of the Second Temple in 70 CE, sectarianism largely came to an end. The Zealots, Sadducees, and Essenes disappeared, while the Early Christians and the Pharisees survived, the latter transforming into Rabbinic Judaism, today known simply as "Judaism". The term "Pharisee" was no longer used, perhaps because it was a term more often used by non-Pharisees, but also because the term was explicitly sectarian, and the rabbis claimed leadership over all Jews.

Many historians argue that the gospels took their final form after the Great Revolt and the destruction of the Temple, although some scholars put the authorship of Mark in the 60s; this could help one understand their context. Strack theorizes that the growth of a Christian canon (the New Testament) was a factor that influenced the rabbis to record the oral law in writing.

A significant contributing factor to the split was the two groups' differing theological interpretations of the Temple's destruction. Rabbinic Judaism saw the destruction as a chastisement for neglecting the Torah. The early Christians however saw it as God's punishment for the Jewish rejection of Jesus, leading to the claim that the 'true' Israel was now the Church. Jews believed this claim was scandalous. According to Fredriksen, since early Christians believed that Jesus had already replaced the Temple as the expression of a new covenant, they were relatively unconcerned with the destruction of the Temple during the First Jewish-Roman War.

Controversies over Passover and the Eucharist

Rejection of Jewish Christianity
In Christian circles, the term "Nazarene" later came to be used as a label for those Christians who were faithful to Jewish law, in particular, it was used as a label for a certain sect of Christians. At first, these Jewish Christians, originally the central group in Christianity, were not declared unorthodox but they were later excluded from the Jewish community and denounced. Some Jewish Christian groups, such as the Ebionites, were accused of having unorthodox beliefs, particularly in relation to their views of Christ and gentile converts. The Nazarenes, who held to orthodoxy but adhered to Jewish law, were not deemed heretical until the dominance of orthodoxy in the 4th century. The Ebionites may have been a splinter group of Nazarenes, with disagreements over Christology and leadership. After the condemnation of the Nazarenes, the term "Ebionite" was often used as a general pejorative for all related "heresies".

Jewish Christians constituted a community which was separate from the Pauline Christians. There was a post-Nicene "double rejection" of the Jewish Christians by adherents of gentile Christianity and Rabbinic Judaism. It is believed that no direct confrontation occurred between the adherents of gentile Christianity and the adherents of Judaic Christianity. However, by this time, the practice of Judeo-Christianity was diluted by internal schisms and external pressures. Gentile Christianity remained the sole strand of orthodoxy and it imposed itself on the previously Jewish Christian sanctuaries, taking full control of those houses of worship by the end of the 5th century.

Growing anti-Jewish sentiment in Christian writings
Growing anti-Jewish sentiment among early Christians is evidenced by the Epistle of Barnabas, a late-1st/early-2nd century letter attributed to Barnabas, the companion of Paul mentioned in the Acts of the Apostles, although it could be by Barnabas of Alexandria, or an anonymous author using the name Barnabas. In no other writing of that early time is the separation of the gentile Christians from observant Jews so clearly insisted upon. Christians, according to Barnabas, are the only true covenant people, and the Jewish people are no longer in covenant with God. Circumcision and the entire Jewish sacrificial and ceremonial system have been abolished in favor of "the new law of our Lord Jesus Christ". Barnabas claims that Jewish scriptures, rightly understood, serve as a foretelling of Christ and its laws often contain allegorical meanings.

While 2nd-century Marcionism rejected all Jewish influence on Christianity, Proto-orthodox Christianity instead retained some of the doctrines and practices of 1st-century Judaism while rejecting others. They held the Jewish scriptures to be authoritative and sacred, employing mostly the Septuagint or Targum translations, and adding other texts as the New Testament canon developed. Christian baptism was another continuation of a Judaic practice.

Later Jewish Christianity

Antiquity

Ebionites

The Ebionites were a Jewish Christian movement that existed during the early centuries of the Christian Era. They show strong similarities with the earliest form of Jewish Christianity, and their specific theology may have been a "reaction to the law-free Gentile mission." They regarded Jesus as the Messiah while rejecting his divinity and his virgin birth, and insisted on the necessity of following Jewish law and rites. They used the Gospel of the Ebionites, one of the Jewish–Christian gospels; the Hebrew Book of Matthew starting at chapter 3; revered James the brother of Jesus (James the Just); and rejected Paul the Apostle as an apostate from the Law. Their name ( Ebionaioi, derived from Hebrew  ebyonim, ebionim, meaning "the poor" or "poor ones") suggests that they placed a special value on voluntary poverty.

Distinctive features of the Gospel of the Ebionites include the absence of the virgin birth and of the genealogy of Jesus; an Adoptionist Christology, in which Jesus is chosen to be God's Son at the time of his Baptism; the abolition of the Jewish sacrifices by Jesus; and an advocacy of vegetarianism.

Nazarenes

The Nazarenes originated as a sect of first-century Judaism. The first use of the term "sect of the Nazarenes" is in the Book of Acts in the New Testament, where Paul is accused of being a ringleader of the sect of the Nazarenes ("πρωτοστάτην τε τῆς τῶν Ναζωραίων αἱρέσεως"). The term then simply designated followers of "Yeshua Natzri" (Jesus the Nazarene), but in the first to fourth centuries the term was used for a sect of followers of Jesus who were closer to Judaism than most Christians. They are described by Epiphanius of Salamis and are mentioned later by Jerome and Augustine of Hippo, who made a distinction between the Nazarenes of their time and the "Nazarenes" mentioned in Acts 24:5.

The Nazarenes were similar to the Ebionites, in that they considered themselves Jews, maintained an adherence to the Law of Moses, and used only the Aramaic Gospel of the Hebrews, rejecting all the Canonical gospels. However, unlike half of the Ebionites, they accepted the Virgin Birth.

The Gospel of the Hebrews was a syncretic Jewish–Christian gospel, the text of which is lost; only fragments of it survive as brief quotations by the early Church Fathers and in apocryphal writings. The fragments contain traditions of Jesus' pre-existence, incarnation, baptism, and probable temptation, along with some of his sayings. Distinctive features include a Christology characterized by the belief that the Holy Spirit is Jesus' Divine Mother; and a first resurrection appearance to James, the brother of Jesus, showing a high regard for James as the leader of the Jewish Christian church in Jerusalem. It was probably composed in Greek in the first decades of the 2nd century, and is believed to have been used by Greek-speaking Jewish Christians in Egypt during that century.

The Gospel of the Nazarenes is the title given to fragments of one of the lost Jewish-Christian Gospels of Matthew partially reconstructed from the writings of Jerome.

Knanaya

The Knanaya of India descend from Syriac Christians of Jewish origin who migrated to India from Mesopotamia between the 4th and 9th century under the leadership of the merchant Knai Thoma. In the modern age, they are a minority community found among the St. Thomas Christians. The culture of the Knanaya has been analyzed by a number of Jewish scholars who have noted that the community maintains striking correlations to Jewish communities, in particular the Cochin Jews of Kerala. The culture of the Knanaya is a blend of Jewish-Christian, Syriac, and Hindu customs reflecting both the foreign origin of the community and the centuries that they have lived as a minority community in India.

Surviving Byzantine and 'Syriac' communities in the Middle East
Some typically Grecian "Ancient Synagogal" priestly rites have survived partially to the present, notably in the distinct church service of the Greek Orthodox Church of Antioch, Syriac Orthodox Church and the Melkite Greek Catholic communities of the Hatay Province of Southern Turkey, Syria and Lebanon.

The unique combination of ethnocultural traits inhered from the fusion of a Greek-Macedonian cultural base, Hellenistic Judaism and Roman civilization gave birth to the distinctly Antiochian "Middle Eastern-Roman" Christian traditions of Cilicia (Southeastern Turkey) and Syria/Lebanon:

Members of these communities still call themselves Rûm which literally means "Eastern Roman", "Byzantine" or "Asian Greek" in Turkish, Persian and Arabic. The term "Rûm" is used in preference to "Ionani" or "Yāvāni" which means "European Greek" or "Ionian" in Classical Arabic and Ancient Hebrew.

Most Middle-Eastern "Melkites" or "Rûms", can trace their ethnocultural heritage to the Southern Anatolian ('Cilician') and Syrian Hellenized Greek-speaking Jewish communities of the past and Greek and Macedonian settlers ('Greco-Syrians'), founders of the original "Antiochian Greek" communities of Cilicia, Northwestern Syria and Lebanon. Counting members of the surviving minorities in the Hatay Province of Turkey, in Syria, Lebanon, Northern Israel and their relatives in the diaspora, there are more than 1.8 million Greco-Melkite Christians residing in the Northern-MENA, the US, Canada and Latin America today, i.e., Greek Orthodox and Greek Catholic Christians under the ancient jurisdictional authority of the patriarchates of Antioch and Jerusalem ("Orthodox" in the narrow sense) or their Uniat offshoots ("Catholic" or "united" with Rome).

Today, certain families are associated with descent from the early Jewish Christians of Antioch, Damascus, Judea, and Galilee.  Some of those families carry surnames such as Youhanna (John), Hanania (Ananias), Sahyoun (Zion), Eliyya/Elias (Elijah), Chamoun/Shamoun (Simeon/Simon), Semaan/Simaan (Simeon/Simon), Menassa (Manasseh), Salamoun/Suleiman (Solomon), Youwakim (Joachim), Zakariya (Zacharias), Kolath and others.

Contemporary movements
In modern times, the term "Jewish Christian" is generally used in reference to ethnic Jews who have either converted to or been raised in Christianity. They are mostly members of Catholic, Protestant and Orthodox Christian congregations, and they are generally assimilated into the Christian mainstream, but they may also retain a strong sense of attachment to their Jewish identity. Some Jewish Christians also refer to themselves as "Hebrew Christians".

The Hebrew Christian movement of the 19th century was an initiative which was largely led and integrated by Anglicans, and they included figures such as Michael Solomon Alexander, Bishop of Jerusalem 1842–1845; some figures, such as Joseph Frey, the founder of the London Society for Promoting Christianity amongst the Jews, were more assertive of their Jewish identity and independence.

The 19th century saw at least 250,000 Jews convert to Christianity according to existing records of various societies. According to Data which was provided by the Pew Research Center, as of 2013, about 1.6 million adult American Jews identify themselves as Christians, and most of them identify themselves as Protestants. According to the same data, most of the Jews who identify themselves as some sort of Christian (1.6 million) were either raised as Jews or are Jews by ancestry. According to a 2012 study, 17% of Jews in Russia identify themselves as Christians.

Messianic Judaism is a religious movement which incorporates elements of Judaism with the tenets of Christianity. Its adherents, many of whom are ethnically Jewish, worship in congregations which recite Hebrew prayers. They also baptize messianic believers who are of the age of accountability (able to accept Jesus as the Messiah), often observe kosher
dietary laws and keep Saturday as the Sabbath. Additionally, they recognize the Christian New Testament as holy scripture, though most of them do not use the label "Christian" to describe themselves.

The two groups are not completely distinct; some adherents, for example, favor Messianic congregations but freely live in both worlds, such as the theologian Arnold Fruchtenbaum, the founder of Ariel Ministries.

The Hebrew Catholics are a movement of Jews who converted to Catholicism and Catholics of non-Jewish origin who choose to keep Jewish customs and traditions in light of Catholic doctrine.

See also

 Antisemitism in Christianity
 Christianity and Hellenistic philosophy
 Christianity and Judaism
 Christian–Jewish reconciliation
 Christian observances of Jewish holidays
 Christian Torah-submission
 Christian views on the Old Covenant
 Christian Zionism
 Church's Ministry Among Jewish People
 Church of Zion, Jerusalem
 Conversion of the Jews
 Adventism
 Dispensationalism
 Hebrew Catholics
 Hebrew Christian movement
 Hebrew Roots – A religious movement which accepts both the Old and New Testaments but rejects the Talmud and many Jewish traditions which are not supported by Scripture.
 Higher criticism
 History of the Catholic Church
 History of Christianity
 History of Judaism
 Jesus in the Talmud
 Jesuism
 Jewish history
 Jews for Jesus
 Judaizers
 List of converts to Christianity from Judaism
 Mandaeans
 Messianic Judaism
 Nazarene (sect)
 Noahidism
 People of the Book
 Philo-Semitism
 Restorationism
 Sabbatarianism
 Sacred Name Movement
 Timeline of Christianity
 Timeline of Christian missions
 Timeline of Jewish history
 Timeline of the Roman Catholic Church

Notes

References

Sources

 
 
 

 
 
 
 

 

 
 
 
 
 
 

 
 

 

 

 

 
 

 
 

 
 
 
 

 
 
 

 

 .

  (6th German ed.)

Further reading

External links

Origins of Christianity
 Encyclopaedia Britannica: The History of Christianity
 Patheos.com: The Beginnings and Origins of Christianity
 Originsofchristianity.net: The Origins of Christianity

Jewish Christianity
Jewish Encyclopedia: Christianity in its Relation to Judaism
Netzari Emunah: What is Netzarim?
Jewish Studies for Christians 
 

 
1st-century Christianity
Ancient Christian controversies
Christian terminology
Christianity in Jerusalem
Christianity and Judaism related controversies
Early Christianity
Early Christianity and Judaism
Christianity
Mosaic law in Christian theology